Alan Goehring (born February 21, 1962) is an American retired junk bond analyst and trader from Henderson, Nevada. At the age of 37, he became a professional poker player.

Goehring first made his mark on the poker circuit when he finished in 3rd place in the $3,000 No Limit Hold-Em event at the 1997 World Series of Poker (WSOP). He won $61,845 in the tournament, which was won by Max Stern and also featured Kathy Liebert, Chris Ferguson, Donnacha O'Dea, and Dan Harrington.

In 1999, Goehring finished 2nd in the WSOP $10,000 No Limit Hold-Em Main Event to Noel Furlong. He won $768,625 for his efforts. This finish, coupled with several other 2nd-place finishes, including in Bellagio's Inaugural No Limit Hold-Em tournament, earned him a reputation as a player who "could not win the big one."

Goehring eventually overcame this status by winning the World Poker Tour (WPT) $25,000 season 1 championship, overcoming Russian newcomer Kirill Gerasimov in the eventual heads-up confrontation to take home a $1,011,886 grand prize. The final table also included Phil Ivey, Doyle Brunson and Ted Forrest.

Goehring made two final tables in the WPT's 4th season. He finished 6th at the 2005 WPT €10,000 Grand Prix de Paris, eventually won by Roland De Wolfe. He went on to win the LA Poker Classic later in the season, winning a then-WPT record-breaking $2,391,550.

Fellow professional Howard Lederer has repeatedly spoken positively about the quality of Goehring's play on his website.

As of January 2015, his total live tournament winnings exceed $5,220,000. His 6 cashes at the WSOP account for $851,575 of those winnings.

World Series of Poker bracelets

 An "O" following a year denotes bracelet(s) won during the World Series of Poker Online

References

External links
 World Poker Tour profile

1962 births
American poker players
Living people
World Poker Tour winners
World Series of Poker bracelet winners
People from Henderson, Nevada